Brachychirotherium is an ichnogenus, a form taxon based on footprints. It was first characterized from examples found in Triassic beds in Germany, but has since been found in Triassic beds of France, South Africa, South America in Argentina, Peru,  and Bolivia, and North America.

Front (manus) and read (pes) footprints are distinguishable. The pes prints show five toes, with the fifth toe reduced to an oval pad. The manus prints likewise show five digits of similar length. Both kinds of prints show a fairly primitive anatomy, and the prints may have been produced by a rausuchid or other large thecodont (crocodile-like ancestors of reptiles).

Species

B. circaparvum Willruth, 1971
B. gallicum Willruth, 1971
B. lorteci Willruth, 1971
B. thuringiacum Ruhle von Lilienstern, 1938
B. tintati Willruth, 1971

See also 

 List of dinosaur ichnogenera

References 

Reptile trace fossils
Triassic animals
Jurassic animals